Wimple Dome is an ice-covered hill, 725 m, standing 2 nautical miles (3.7 km) south of Hanson Hill and 2 nautical miles (3.7 km) east of Bone Bay on the north side of Trinity Peninsula. The name was applied by members of the Falkland Islands Dependencies Survey (FIDS) following their survey in 1948 and is descriptive of the shape of the feature, a wimple being a type of headdress worn by nuns.

Ice caps of Antarctica
Bodies of ice of Graham Land
Landforms of Trinity Peninsula